Joel William McEntire (born 1987) is an American politician of the Republican Party. In 2020, he was elected to the Washington House of Representatives to represent the 19th legislative district and took office on January 11, 2021.

References

External links 
 Joel McEntire at ballotpedia.org

1987 births
Living people
21st-century American politicians
People from Cathlamet, Washington
Republican Party members of the Washington House of Representatives